Project Phoenix may refer to:

 Project Phoenix (SETI), a search for extraterrestrial intelligence by listening for radio signals
 Project Phoenix (South Africa), South African National Defence Force programme to revive its Reserve Force element
 Project Phoenix (BBC), a BBC news-based magazine
 Project Phoenix, a Kickstarter proposal by Hiroaki Yura
 Project Phoenix, a football project of the Hong Kong Football Association

See also
 Phoenix Program, a classified program during the latter stages of the Vietnam War
 Phoenix Project (disambiguation)